Charlecote Park is a grand 16th-century country house, surrounded by its own deer park, on the banks of the River Avon in Charlecote near Wellesbourne, about  east of Stratford-upon-Avon and  south of Warwick, Warwickshire, England. It has been administered by the National Trust since 1946 and is open to the public. It is a Grade I listed building.

History
The Lucy family owned the land since 1247. Charlecote Park was built in 1558 by Sir Thomas Lucy, and Queen Elizabeth I stayed in the room that is now the drawing room. Although the general outline of the Elizabethan house remains, nowadays it is in fact mostly Victorian. Successive generations of the Lucy family had modified Charlecote Park over the centuries, but in 1823, George Hammond Lucy (High Sheriff of Warwickshire in 1831) inherited the house and set about recreating the house in its original style.

Allegedly, William Shakespeare poached rabbits and deer in the park as a young man and was brought before magistrates as a result.

From 1605 to 1640 the house was organised by Sir Thomas Lucy. He had twelve children with Lady Lucy who ran the house after he died. She was known for her piety and distributing alms to the poor each Christmas. Her eldest three sons inherited the house in turn and it then fell to her grandchild Sir Davenport Lucy.

In the Tudor great hall, the 1680 painting Charlecote Park by Sir Godfrey Kneller, is said to be one of the earliest depictions of a black presence in the West Midlands (excluding Roman legionnaires). The painting, of Captain Thomas Lucy, shows a black boy in the background dressed in a blue livery coat and red stockings and wearing a gleaming, metal collar around his neck. The National Trust's Charlecote brochure describes the boy as a "black page boy". In 1735 a black child called Philip Lucy was baptised at Charlecote.

The lands immediately adjoining the house were further landscaped by Capability Brown in about 1760. This resulted in Charlecote becoming a hostelry destination for notable tourists to Stratford from the late 18th to mid-19th century, including Washington Irving (1818), Sir Walter Scott (1828) and Nathaniel Hawthorne (c 1850).

Charlecote was inherited in 1823 by George Hammond Lucy (d 1845), who married Mary Elizabeth Williams of Bodelwyddan Castle, from whose extensive diaries the current "behind the scenes of Victorian Charlecote" are based upon. GH Lucy's second son Henry inherited the estate from his elder brother in 1847. In 1890 artist Edith Mary Hinchley worked on a family tree image on deerskin that involved the creation of 500 heraldic shields. She did the work because she was a genealogist and a friend of the family. The "Lucy Deerskin" is still at Charlecote Park. After the deaths of both Mary Elizabeth and Henry in 1890, the house was rented out by Henry's eldest daughter and heiress, Ada Christina (d 1943). She had married Sir Henry Ramsay-Fairfax, (d 1944), a line of the Fairfax Baronets, who on marriage assumed the name Fairfax-Lucy.

From this point onwards, the family began selling off parts of the outlying estate to fund their extensive lifestyle, and post-World War II in 1946, Sir Montgomerie Fairfax-Lucy, who had inherited the residual estate from his mother Ada, presented Charlecote to the National Trust in-lieu of death duties. Sir Montgomerie was succeeded in 1965 by his brother, Sir Brian, whose wife, Lady Alice, researched the history of Charlecote, and assisted the National Trust with the restoration of the house.

Today

The Great Hall has a barrel-vaulted ceiling made of plaster painted to look like timber and is a fine setting for the splendid collection of family portraits. Other rooms have richly coloured wallpaper, decorated plaster ceilings and wood panelling. There are magnificent pieces of furniture and fine works of art, including a contemporary painting of Queen Elizabeth I. The original two-storey Elizabethan gatehouse that guards the approach to the house remains unaltered.

On display at the house is an original letter from Oliver Cromwell, dated 1654, summoning then-owner Richard Lucy to the Barebones Parliament. Also on display is a 1760 portrait of George Lucy by Thomas Gainsborough which cost Lucy the sum of eight guineas.

A set of archives for the Lucy family at Charlecote is held by the Warwickshire County Record Office. The house also has a display of carriages and a period laundry and brew room.

In April 2012 Charlecote Park featured as the venue for BBC1's Antiques Roadshow.

Charlecote Park has extensive grounds. A parterre has been recreated from the original 1700s plans.

The livestock at Charlecote includes fallow deer, Devon Red Poll cattle, and Jacob sheep which were brought to England from Portugal in 1755 by George Lucy.

Notes

Bibliography
 Charlecote and the Lucys: The Chronicle of an English Family (OUP, 1958) Alice Fairfax-Lucy
 History of the Commoners of Great Britain and Ireland, Volume 3 (1835) John Burke. Lucy of Charlecote pp 97–101.

External links
Wikidata List of Paintings at Charlecote Park

Charlecote Park information at the National Trust
Photos of Charlecote Park and surrounding area on geograph
Photographs of Charlecote in 1892 by George Washington Wilson

Fairfax family residences
Country houses in Warwickshire
National Trust properties in Warwickshire
Grade I listed buildings in Warwickshire
Grade I listed houses
Historic house museums in Warwickshire
Gardens in Warwickshire
Gardens by Capability Brown
Stratford-on-Avon District